Washakie County School District #1 is a public school district based in Worland, Wyoming, United States.

Geography
Washakie County School District #1 serves the western portion of Washakie County, including the following communities:
Incorporated places
City of Worland
Census-designated places (Note: All census-designated places are unincorporated.)
Airport Road
Mc Nutt
South Flat
Washakie Ten
West River
Winchester

Schools

High school
Grades 9-12
Worland High School

Middle school
Grades 6-8
Worland Middle School

Elementary schools
Grades K-5
East Side Elementary School
South Side Elementary School
West Side Elementary School

Student demographics
The following figures are as of October 1, 2019.
Total District Enrollment: 1,244
Student enrollment by gender
Male: 626 (50.32%)
Female: 618 (49.68%)
Student enrollment by ethnicity
White (not Hispanic): 903 (72.59%)
Hispanic: 300 (24.12%)
Asian or Pacific Islander: 4 (0.32%)
American Indian or Alaskan Native: 10 (0.80%)
Black (not Hispanic): 1 (0.08%)
Two or more Races: 26 (2.09%)

See also
List of school districts in Wyoming

References

External links
Washakie County School District #1 – official site.

Education in Washakie County, Wyoming
School districts in Wyoming